Li Wenwen (Pinyin: Lǐ Wén-Wén; born 5 March 2000) is a Chinese weightlifter, Olympic Champion, World Champion, and Asian champion competing in the women's +87 kg division.

Career
In 2019 she competed at the IWF World Cup in Fuzhou, winning silver medals and setting  junior world records in the snatch, clean & jerk and total in the +87 kg category. Later in 2019 she competed at the 2019 Asian Weightlifting Championships in the +87 kg category. In the snatch portion she set a world record with a lift of 147 kg, and won gold medals in all lifts.

She competed at the 2019 World Weightlifting Championships in the +87 kg division against teammate Meng Suping. She had a perfect 6 for 6 day and won gold medals in all lifts which included a world record clean & jerk of 186 kg which also set the total world record.

Li improved on her own world records at the 2020 Asian Weightlifting Championships in 2021. She increased her snatch record from 147 to 148, her clean & jerk record from 186 to 187, and her total record from 332 to 335.

She represented China at the 2020 Summer Olympics in Tokyo, Japan. She competed in the women's +87 kg event, winning the gold medal with a new Olympic record of 320 kg.

Major results

References

External links
 

2000 births
Living people
Chinese female weightlifters
World Weightlifting Championships medalists
Weightlifters at the 2020 Summer Olympics
Medalists at the 2020 Summer Olympics
Olympic gold medalists for China
Olympic medalists in weightlifting
Olympic weightlifters of China
21st-century Chinese women